The Columbarium of Pomponius Hylas is a 1st-century CE Roman columbarium, situated near the Porta Latina on the Via di Porta Latina, Rome, Italy.  It was discovered and excavated in 1831 by Pietro Campana.

Though its name derives from Pomponius Hylas, who lived during the Flavian period (69–96 CE), the building itself has been dated to between 14 and 54 CE due to inscriptions on two of its niches (one dedicated to a freedman of Tiberius and the other to a freedman of Claudia Octavia, daughter of Claudius and Messalina).  It was later bought by Pomponius Hylas for himself and his wife, and he added the mosaic panel over the entrance steps, which is decorated with griffins and reads:

The inscription also has a V (meaning vivit) over Pomponia's name, showing she was alive when the panel was added.

References and citations

Further reading
 Nash, Ernest.  Pictorial Dictionary of Ancient Rome.  London: A. Zwemmer, 1962.

Sources
 Nerone april 1996: The Columbarium of Hylas "
 JSTOR: Proposta per una Classificazione del Terzo Stile Pompeiano

External links

Buildings and structures completed in the 1st century
Ancient Roman tombs and cemeteries in Rome
Pomponius Hylas
Rome R. XIX Celio